The 2020 NASCAR Gander RV & Outdoors Truck Series was the 26th season of the third highest stock car racing series sanctioned by NASCAR in North America. The season began at Daytona International Speedway with the NextEra Energy 250 on February 14. The regular season ended with the ToyotaCare 250 at Richmond Raceway on September 10. The NASCAR playoffs ended with the Lucas Oil 150 at Phoenix Raceway on November 6, where Sheldon Creed won the championship over his teammates Zane Smith and Brett Moffitt in a 1-2-3 sweep for GMS Racing in the standings. ThorSport Racing driver Grant Enfinger finished fourth in the standings, the other driver to advance to the Championship 4. Austin Hill won the regular season championship and was the points leader for most of the season, but failed to advance to the Championship 4 and finished 6th in the standings.

Background
2020 marked the twelfth season for Camping World Holdings as the series' sponsor, with it being the second season under the Gander RV & Outdoors brand. In September 2019, Camping World announced a rebranding of Gander Outdoors stores as part of a shift in strategy, resulting in the stores also carrying recreational vehicle sales and service, henceforth the slight name change to reflect corporate changes. On September 15, 2020, it was announced that the series title sponsor would switch back to the Camping World brand beginning in 2021.

The early season was headlined by incentives for any driver to beat Kyle Busch in four of the races he participated in. After Busch won the race at Las Vegas, the first of his five Truck starts in 2020, which was his seventh series start in a row where he won, Kevin Harvick and Gander RV & Outdoors CEO Marcus Lemonis each offered $50,000 for any full-time Cup Series regular if they were to finish higher than Busch in his remaining four starts of the year. The challenge spurred Cup drivers Chase Elliott and Erik Jones to run Truck races in an attempt to win the $100,000 bounty. Later, Halmar Friesen Racing owner Chris Larsen announced he would offer a different $50,000 bounty to any Truck Series regular who were to finish ahead of Busch in the upcoming races he would be competing in. Elliott would immediately beat Busch and win the bounty at Charlotte, which was the first race it was on the line. He donated half the prize money to Feed the Children, a quarter of it to the American Red Cross, and another quarter of it to Kyle and Samantha Busch's Bundle of Joy Foundation.

When the season was put on hold due to the COVID-19 pandemic, drivers from all NASCAR series, including many Truck Series drivers, participated in the inaugural eNASCAR iRacing Pro Invitational Series during that time.

Teams and drivers

Complete schedule

Limited schedule

Notes

Changes

Teams
 On October 31, 2019, Kyle Busch confirmed on NASCAR America that Kyle Busch Motorsports will run two trucks full-time for the championship, as well as another truck for a rotating cast of drivers, including himself and Chandler Smith. On November 14, Canadian Raphaël Lessard, and 2019 ARCA Menards Series champion Christian Eckes were announced for both full-time entries, with both also competing for Rookie of the Year.
 After running two trucks full-time in 2019, GMS Racing will expand to four full-time trucks in 2020 with the addition of Tyler Ankrum from DGR-Crosley and Zane Smith from JR Motorsports in the Xfinity Series. They will also run a fifth truck part-time for Sam Mayer as well as World of Outlaws driver David Gravel (in one race), and Hendrick Motorsports Cup Series driver Chase Elliott (three). The truck number for the fifth truck was confirmed to be the No. 24 on January 10, 2020. Ankrum's new team, the No. 26, was revealed to be using the owner points from Moffitt's No. 24 truck in 2019. As a result, Moffitt's renumbered No. 23 truck started the year with no owner points. However, Moffitt, the 2018 Truck Series champion, is eligible to use the champion's provisional to lock himself into races.
 On December 20, 2019, Diversified Motorsports Enterprises completed its purchase of JJL Motorsports. As a result, the owner points of the JJL No. 97 were transferred to DME.
 On January 13, 2020, Front Row Motorsports announced their expansion into the Truck Series through an alliance with DGR-Crosley. They will field the No. 38 Ford F-150, which inherits its owner points from DGR-Crosley's No. 54 team.
 On January 13, 2020, Bill McAnally Racing announced a partnership with Bill Hilgemann, renaming their Truck Series team McAnally-Hilgemann Racing to reflect his co-ownership. In addition, the team has formed a technical alliance with Hattori Racing Enterprises.
 On January 21, 2020, Win-Tron Racing announced their return to the Truck Series, with them fielding the No. 32 Chevrolet part-time for Howie DiSavino III (one of their ARCA drivers). Excluding a partnership with AM Racing in 2016 and 2017, this will be Win-Tron's first time in the series since 2015, when they ran the No. 35 Toyota. In addition to that effort, Win-Tron partnered with the Hill Motorsports No. 56 team to jointly field Gus Dean, one of their ARCA drivers, at Daytona.
 On January 29, 2020, when it was announced that Angela Ruch would be driving full-time for Reaume Brothers Racing, it was revealed that her truck number would be the No. 00, a new number for RBR. The No. 00 was previously the No. 34 team, with the part-time No. 32 in 2019 becoming the No. 34 for 2020. Despite these number changes, it was revealed on February 3, 2020, that the No. 00 would use the 2019 owner points from the No. 12 Young's Motorsports team, which was not run full-time in 2020. The No. 34 will use the owner points from last season's No. 34 team instead of the old No. 32.
 On February 3, 2020, Bob Pockrass reported the owner points of the DGR-Crosley No. 17 would be transferred to the No. 15 in 2020, which meant that the No. 15 would be the team's primary truck this season and the No. 17 would not be fielded full-time.
 On February 5, 2020, Jordan Anderson Racing, AM Racing, and Win-Tron Racing announced they would all be sharing a race shop and resources this season. It is the former Front Row Motorsports shop in Statesville, North Carolina. Despite this partnership, the three teams are not merging into one.
 On February 15, 2020 (the day after the season-opener at Daytona), it was mentioned in a Frontstretch article that the NEMCO Motorsports No. 8 truck would only be running part-time in 2020 and would be skipping the second race of the year at Las Vegas. In 2019, the truck ran with multiple drivers after John Hunter Nemechek's move to the Xfinity Series full-time, including Angela Ruch (before she left for Niece Motorsports), Tony Mrakovich and Trey Hutchens (who moved over to NEMCO after DNQ's with their own teams), Camden Murphy, as well as both John Hunter and Joe Nemechek in a few races each. NEMCO also sold the No. 8's owner points from 2019 to the No. 21 GMS Racing truck of Zane Smith before the start of the season.
 On February 18, 2020, it was revealed through the Atlanta entry list that Rette Jones Racing's Truck Series team, the No. 11, would be owned by their driver, Spencer Davis instead in 2020 under the name Spencer Davis Motorsports. The team has a partnership with Sam Hunt Racing and bought the owner points from KBM's part-time No. 46 truck, and with that truck's crew chief, Michael Shelton, becoming the No. 11 SDM crew chief for the 2020 season. It is unclear how many races the team plans to run, however, Davis did register for rookie of the year in 2020.
 On February 20, 2020, it was announced that CMI Motorsports would be fielding a second truck, the No. 83, for the first time at Las Vegas with Stefan Parsons driving it. On May 25, 2020, it was announced that T. J. Bell would drive the No. 83 at Charlotte.
 On March 3, 2020, it was announced that both former Truck Series teams Billy Ballew Motorsports and Wauters Motorsports as well as former Cup Series team Phoenix Racing would jointly be restarted and returning to the series with Erik Jones running at Homestead as he seeks the Kyle Busch $100,000 bounty. However, Ballew stated the team has no plans to return besides the one race. Following the postponement of the Homestead race due to the COVID-19 pandemic, Jones was announced to compete at Charlotte.
 On May 20, 2020, Niece Motorsports announced the debut of a fourth truck for the team, the No. 42, which will be driven by Ross Chastain at Charlotte.
 On May 26, 2020, it had been announced that Clauson-Marshall Racing, a dirt racing team, would be making their first attempt in NASCAR, partnering with Niece Motorsports to field 2-time USAC champion Tyler Courtney in one of Niece's trucks for the dirt race at Eldora before the race was cancelled as part of the COVID-19 schedule changes.

Drivers
 On July 1, 2019, Toyota Racing executive Jack Irving Jr. stated that Hailie Deegan could run some Truck Series races in 2020. Deegan's name was in the mix to be joining DGR-Crosley, whom she had run one East Series race for in 2019. On December 17, Ford Performance announced the addition of Deegan to its driver development program. Deegan's father Brian stated that she will focus on the ARCA Menards Series in 2020 before tentatively moving to the Truck Series in 2021 and the Xfinity Series in 2023. On October 7, Deegan announced that she would make her first Truck start at the 2020 Clean Harbors 200 at Kansas, driving the DGR-Crosley No. 17 truck.
 On November 14, 2019, it was announced that 2019 Rookie of the Year Tyler Ankrum would join GMS Racing from DGR-Crosley and would drive a third full-time truck for them, which was later decided to be the No. 26.
 On November 19, 2019, it was announced that GMS Racing would also add a fourth full-time truck in 2020 with Zane Smith driving, who last year ran a part-time schedule in the Xfinity Series for JR Motorsports, which is aligned with GMS as part of the Drivers Edge Development program and it was later revealed he would be driving the No. 21 truck.
 On November 21, 2019, it was announced that Myatt Snider, who drove for ThorSport Racing for two years (full-time in 2018 in the No. 13 and part-time in 2019 in the No. 27), would be moving up to the Xfinity Series in 2020, running a part-time schedule for Richard Childress Racing. It was also confirmed on December 3, 2019 that Anthony Alfredo, who drove part-time for DGR-Crosley in 2019 (mostly in the No. 15 truck), would join Snider at RCR in the Xfinity Series for a part-time schedule as well.
 On November 24, 2019, it was announced that Tim Viens rented out a ride with Mike Affarano Motorsports to drive their No. 03 for the NextEra Energy 250 at Daytona International Speedway. On January 15, 2020, the team again posted on their Facebook page saying that Viens would attempt the whole season in the No. 03 with sponsorship from the Patriots PAC of America (for President Donald Trump's re-election campaign), though the odds of them being able to make it to every race was minimal. The team was on the entry list for Daytona, but on the way to the track, their hauler got stuck in a ditch due to icy roads and they had to withdraw.
 On December 10, 2019, it was announced that Ty Majeski would join Niece Motorsports full-time in 2020, replacing Ross Chastain. Majeski previously piloted the organization's No. 44 entry at Phoenix Raceway in November 2019.
 On December 11, 2019, it was announced that Brennan Poole, who drove most of the Truck Series schedule for On Point Motorsports in 2019, would be running full-time in the Cup Series driving the No. 15 for Premium Motorsports in 2020. However, he still ran Daytona for the team.
 On December 16, 2019, DGR-Crosley announced that Tanner Gray would drive the No. 15 Ford full-time in 2020.
 On December 18, 2019, Ross Chastain announced on a video that he would be back to run some races with Niece Motorsports again in 2020, likely in the No. 44 and sharing that truck with multiple drivers.
 On December 18, 2019, Henderson Motorsports announced that they planned to enter some races with other drivers in addition to Parker Kligerman in 2020.
 On December 20, 2019, Niece Motorsports announced that Carson Hocevar would drive for them in nine races in 2020, which came in the team's part-time No. 40 truck, which was previously the No. 38 until Front Row Motorsports took that number for their new Truck team. Hocevar ran two Truck races last year for Jordan Anderson Racing as well as part-time in ARCA for the last two years with KBR Development.
 On January 2, 2020, Bobby Gerhart announced that he has decided to not drive this season after suffering a heart attack on Christmas. However, he did say that he would still like to field his team at Daytona with another driver in his Truck and ARCA rides. The Gerhart team ended up not even entering either race with someone else driving.
 On January 10, 2020, GMS Racing announced that World of Outlaws driver David Gravel would drive six races in the No. 24 Chevrolet, with Eldora being the only one of which is confirmed at this time.
 On January 13, 2020, it was announced that Todd Gilliland would drive the Front Row Motorsports No. 38 truck in 2020.
 On January 13, 2020, defending West Series champion Derek Kraus was announced as the driver for the No. 19 McAnally-Hilgemann Racing Toyota in 2020. He drove that truck part-time in 2019 as well as running full-time for McAnally in what is now the ARCA Menards Series West.
 On January 16, 2020, Niece Motorsports announced that Natalie Decker would be driving their No. 44 truck in eight races. In 2019, she drove all but four races of the season in the DGR-Crosley No. 54, a truck that will not be fielded in 2020. Decker was forced to miss the Pocono race after being hospitalized on June 23 for bile duct complications that resulted from her gallbladder surgery in December 2019. On September 25, Decker was not medically cleared to race at Las Vegas after experiencing a high heart rate and high blood pressure; because her truck had cleared inspection and was placed on the starting grid, she was credited with a last-place finish in the race.
 On January 21, 2020, it was announced that Howie DiSavino III, who drove for Win-Tron Racing part-time in the ARCA Menards Series in 2019, would do the same in 2020 but also run some truck races for the team, making their return to the series for the first time since 2015. He was to drive a No. 32 truck with his debut coming at the new Richmond race, but the team ended up not attempting the race after it was rescheduled from May to September due to COVID-19.
 On January 27, 2020, Young's Motorsports announced that Tate Fogleman would drive the team's flagship truck, the No. 02, full-time, replacing Tyler Dippel. He drove part-time for the team in 2018, but did not run any races for them or with any other team in the series in 2019.
 On January 29, 2020, Angela Ruch announced she would run the full schedule in the No. 00 Chevrolet for Reaume Brothers Racing.
 On January 30, CMI Motorsports announced that Bayley Currey had joined the team and would drive the team's No. 49 at Las Vegas. Currey's start will be in addition to team owner-driver Ray Ciccarelli's races with the team. Currey would also drive for the team at Charlotte as well.
 On February 6, 2020, Niece Motorsports announced that Super Late Model driver Jett Noland will drive the No. 44 Chevrolet in six races.
 After Kyle Busch's win in the race at Las Vegas, Kevin Harvick tweeted on February 22, 2020 that he would personally award $50,000 to any full-time Cup Series driver who entered any number of the remaining four races of Busch's Truck schedule and would win the race over him without purposely crashing him out to do so. Soon after, Marcus Lemonis, the CEO of the series title sponsor, Gander RV & Outdoors, announced he would match Harvick's money for a total of an $100,000 payout. Several drivers, including Denny Hamlin, Corey LaJoie, Austin Dillon, and Clint Bowyer expressed interest in entering if they could find rides. The first two drivers to officially announce participation in the challenge were Chase Elliott, who was announced to run at Atlanta and Kansas, and Kyle Larson, who was announced to run at Homestead, both in the GMS Racing No. 24. The pandemic, however, affected the schedule, as all three races were postponed, forcing the schedule to be changed. After Larson was suspended for uttering a racial slur in an iRacing event held during the pandemic break, he was replaced by Elliott in his scheduled start at Homestead. Because Kyle Busch would reschedule his start at Kansas (which was moved to July) to the Charlotte race in May, Elliott would also instead compete at Charlotte. 
 On May 20, 2020, Garrett Smithley was announced as the driver of the Niece Motorsports No. 40 truck at Charlotte.
 On August 3, 2020, GMS Racing announced that Kris Wright would drive the No. 24 Chevrolet at the Daytona Road Course.
 On August 13, 2020, it was announced that Dawson Cram would be leaving Long Motorsports, after having competed for the team part-time throughout the season, including at Michigan, where he scored a 14th-place finish. He and his family ended up buying Long Motorsports to form their own team, Cram Racing Enterprises, who he would drive for the remainder of the season.
 On October 4, 2020, Stewart Friesen announced he would skip the race at Kansas in October after the race was moved from Friday to Saturday of that week, as it conflicted with a prior commitment to compete in the Short Track Super Series "Speed Showcase" 200 at Port Royal Speedway. Halmar Friesen Racing initially announced Christopher Bell as his substitute driver in the No. 52 Toyota, but because it was a playoff race, Cup Series drivers such as Bell were ineligible to compete in it. The team would then announce on October 9 that Timothy Peters would instead substitute for Friesen.
 On October 16, 2020, it was announced that 2012 series champion James Buescher would return to NASCAR after being without a ride for over five years, driving one of the Niece Motorsports trucks in the October race at his home track of Texas.

Crew chiefs
 On November 20, 2019, it was confirmed that Jerry Baxter, the crew chief of the No. 24 (now the No. 23) truck, had left GMS Racing after the 2019 season. He will be working for Richard Petty Motorsports as the crew chief for Bubba Wallace and the No. 43 team in the Cup Series in 2020.
 On December 11, 2019, Kyle Busch Motorsports announced their 2020 crew chief lineup. Rudy Fugle will be in charge of the No. 18 Toyota of Christian Eckes, Mike Hillman Jr. will handle the No. 4 truck of Raphaël Lessard, and former Richard Childress Racing crew chief Danny Stockman Jr. will lead the No. 51 team driven by Kyle Busch, Chandler Smith, and other drivers to be announced at a later date.
 On December 13, 2019, GMS Racing announced their crew chief lineup for the 2020 season. Chad Norris has been named crew chief for Brett Moffitt and the No. 23 Chevrolet team, Chad Walter will lead Tyler Ankrum and the No. 26 team, Kevin Manion will call the shots for Zane Smith who will drive the No. 21 entry, and Jeff Stankiewicz will remain as the crew chief for the No. 2 team piloted by Sheldon Creed.
 On January 13, 2020, Jon Leonard was named the crew chief for Front Row Motorsports' new truck team with Todd Gilliland. Last year, he worked as an engineer for Richard Childress Racing. Prior to that, he was at Leavine Family Racing, where he was also the interim crew chief for their No. 95 car for over half of the 2018 Cup Series season with drivers Kasey Kahne and Regan Smith.
 On January 15, 2020, it was announced that Shane Wilson would be the crew chief for the No. 15 team of DGR-Crosley and rookie Tanner Gray. Wilson crew chiefed Ryan Sieg and his No. 39 Xfinity Series team in 2019, leading him to having many good runs and a playoff spot.
 On January 28, 2020, Clay Greenfield Motorsports announced that Fox NASCAR commentator Jeff Hammond would come out of retirement and be the crew chief of their No. 68 Toyota. Hammond's career as a crew chief dates back to 1982, when he helped Darrell Waltrip win his second Cup Series championship.
 On February 11, 2020, several more crew chief changes for the 2020 season were revealed through the release of the Daytona entry list.
 Joe Lax replaced Buddy Sisco as Spencer Boyd's crew chief on the No. 20 truck for Young's Motorsports. In 2019, he was the crew chief for Ray Ciccarelli's No. 49 CMI Motorsports truck, where he led the underdog team to a top-10 finish at Michigan.
 Replacing Lax at CMI was rookie crew chief Wesley Hopkins.
 Paul Clapprood replaced Kevin Eagle as the crew chief of the No. 44 for Niece Motorsports. He was the crew chief for the JD Motorsports No. 4 in the Xfinity Series in 2019, where he worked with a multitude of drivers, including Ross Chastain, who also drives for Niece part-time in Trucks.
 Frank Kerr replaced Niece Motorsports team manager Cody Efaw as the crew chief of the team's part-time No. 40 (formerly No. 38) truck. Kerr worked for DGR-Crosley in 2019 as the crew chief for their No. 54 truck driven by Natalie Decker. However, he lost his job with DGR after they closed down the No. 54 team. Decker is also at Niece this season driving one of their other trucks, the No. 44.
 Rick Markle replaced On Point Motorsports team owner Steven Lane as the crew chief of that team's No. 30 truck. The last time he was a crew chief was for one of the cars of the closed JGL Racing team in the Xfinity Series in 2018. Lane was also working for JGL at the time, and the two are reunited again.
 Andrew Abbott is the new crew chief for the No. 00 Reaume Brothers Racing truck of Angela Ruch. However, it is unclear if he will remain in that position for the entirety of the season, given he is also the crew chief of Jeremy Clements's No. 51 Xfinity Series team.
 Bill Johnson, another rookie crew chief, replaced Brian Poff as Norm Benning's crew chief for the 2020 season. This continues the trend of the past few years where Benning has had a new crew chief at the start of each year. Johnson, however, would pass away partway through the 2020 season. He was replaced by John Vullo.
 Bryan Smith, the former owner of the closed TriStar Motorsports team which competed in the Cup and Xfinity Series through 2018, has replaced Tim Silva as Jennifer Jo Cobb's crew chief this season. Silva joined CMI Motorsports and would be the crew chief of their new second truck, the No. 83.
 On February 27, 2020, GMS Racing announced that the crew chief for their part-time No. 24 truck would be Charles Denike, who is usually an engineer for the team. Denike has crew chiefed for GMS in the past with their former part-time Xfinity Series No. 96 car driven by Ben Kennedy in 2017.

Interim crew chiefs
 Prior to the Chevrolet Silverado 250 at Talladega on October 3, 2020, Halmar Friesen Racing No. 52 crew chief Tripp Bruce was suspended for the race and the team was docked 20 points for a truck bed cover vent hole rule violation during pre-race inspection. HFR engineer Jon Leonard took over as interim crew chief for Stewart Friesen in the race.
 Prior to the Chevrolet Silverado 250 at Talladega on October 3, 2020, CR7 Motorsports No. 9 crew chief Doug George was suspended for the race and the team was docked 20 points for a truck bed cover vent hole rule violation during pre-race inspection. CR7 truck chief and hauler driver Mark Huff took over as interim crew chief for Codie Rohrbaugh in the race.
 After the No. 51 Kyle Busch Motorsports truck had a loose wheel during one of their pit stops in the SpeedyCash.com 400 at Texas on October 25, 2020, crew chief Danny Stockman Jr. was suspended for three races, and Wes Ward filled in as crew chief for the team in the final two races of the season.

Manufacturers
 On December 3, 2019, it was announced that the No. 52 Halmar Friesen Racing team would switch from Chevrolet and an alliance with GMS Racing to Toyota and an alliance with Kyle Busch Motorsports starting in 2020.
 On December 11, 2019, DGR-Crosley announced that they would be switching from Toyota to Ford beginning in 2020.
 On January 24, 2020, it was revealed through a paint scheme of one of the team's trucks for this season that Diversified Motorsports Enterprises (formerly JJL Motorsports) would be switching from Ford to Chevrolet this season, likely because driver Jesse Little is driving full-time for JD Motorsports, a Chevrolet team, in the NASCAR Xfinity Series. Also, the crew chief of the team is Bruce Cook, who is the owner of Cook-Finley Racing, a former Truck series team that fielded Chevy trucks in the year before. DME and Cook-Finley Racing also share the same shop.
 On February 11, 2020, it was revealed through the Daytona entry list that NEMCO Motorsports would switch from Chevrolet to Ford starting this season due to John Hunter Nemechek driving for Front Row Motorsports, a Ford team, in the Cup Series. However, the No. 8 truck would still be a Chevrolet when Mike Skeen and Camden Murphy drove it in each of their starts.

Sponsorship
 On December 2, 2019, NASCAR announced that the organization will not allow CBD sponsorships partly due to restrictions from its media rights partners and also because of FIA regulations (cannabinoids, which CBD is part, is a Prohibited Substance in the WADA Code that is used by the FIA; NASCAR is a member of the ASN of the FIA in the United States, the Automobile Competition Committee for the United States).
 On January 14, 2020, it was reported that NASCAR was in advanced discussions with Verizon Communications on a new partnership, which includes upgrading the tracks with 5G technology.
 On January 24, 2020, Diversified Motorsports Enterprises announced that Teletrac Navman would be the sponsor of their No. 97 truck and driver Jesse Little in six races this season.
 On February 27, 2020, Chase Elliott revealed that Hooters, one of his sponsors in the Cup Series, would sponsor his Truck Series start in the GMS No. 24 at Atlanta. This is their first time sponsoring a team in the Truck Series since 2007, when the company's energy drink was the full-time sponsor for the former Pennington Motorsports No. 7 team driven by drivers Derrike Cope, Casey Kingsland, Brad Keselowski, and Jason White.

Rule changes
 Similar to 2019, NASCAR Cup Series drivers will only be allowed to compete in five races. Cup drivers also are not allowed to compete in the Triple Truck Challenge as well as the final eight races of the season (the final race before the playoffs and the NASCAR playoffs). Unlike 2019, the rule now applies to drivers declaring for Cup Series points with three or more years of Cup Series experience, down from five years of experience in 2019. Another change from 2019 is that the entry deadline requirement for the Triple Truck Challenge eligibility has been removed, which prevented Greg Biffle from being eligible for the bonus money from the other two Triple Truck Challenge races after winning the first leg in Texas last year. So starting in 2020, the entire field will be vying for the bonus each week.
 NASCAR also decided to expand the Truck Series playoff to 10 drivers instead of 8 that were in the years before. Now the structure will be: 3 races in the Round of 10 after which two drivers will be eliminated. 3 races in the Round of 8 with four drivers being eliminated and four drivers will compete for the championship in the season finale.
 Controlled cautions will be used for standalone races (not part of a Cup Series weekend; at Iowa Speedway, World Wide Technology Raceway, and Canadian Tire Motorsport Park). This procedure includes restrictions on tire changes and refueling to prevent teams from hiring specialized pit crews. The controlled caution procedure will not be in effect for weekends where either series is with the Cup Series. The rules are as follows:
Each team will consist of eight pit crew members. This includes four to service the car, one fueler, and one driver assistant.
On oval tracks, teams may add fuel and change two tires per pit stop.
On road courses, teams may add fuel or change four tires per pit stop.
Restarts under caution will be in the following order:
 Cars that did not pit.
 Cars that pitted one time, followed by two times.
 Free Pass, Wave Around vehicles, Penalty vehicles.
 Teams involved in incidents are allowed to change four tires at once to avoid damaging the vehicle.
Penalties are as follows:
 A team must restart on the tail end of the lead lap if they exceed the time limit on pit road or they pit other than the designated lap.
 A team must serve a two-lap penalty if they change all four tires and add fuel on any pit stop, change tires under green (unless approved by NASCAR for damage caused by an incident), or perform a four-tire change on any pit stop (Iowa and Gateway only).

Changes due to the COVID-19 pandemic
In NASCAR's first races back since the pandemic hit, there would be no practice or qualifying held so that teams would not need to bring additional crew members to the track and would not need to bring backup cars. (Crew members would be in contact with each other when repairing a primary car damaged in practice or qualifying or to prepare a backup car if a team had to utilize it).

In the Gander RV & Outdoors Truck Series and Xfinity Series races that will be held without practice and qualifying, NASCAR announced that the field size temporarily will be expanded to a maximum of 40 vehicles each. The field will be set by a random draw, similar to NASCAR Cup Series.

On July 21, NASCAR announced that the remaining national series events on the 2020 schedule will be held without practice and qualifying.

On July 29, NASCAR announced further changes to the controlled caution procedure at World Wide Technology Raceway to make the pit stop rules similar to the original Truck Series rules from 1995 to 1998.

Lead lap and lapped trucks will be able to pit on the first lap pit lane is open. Typically, lead lap trucks on the first lap, lapped trucks on the second lap.
Tires may not be changed during the race except for designated stage breaks after Lap 55 and 110 except if tire was flat to avoid damaging the vehicle.
Trucks may be refueled at any pit stop.
Teams will have three minutes to conduct a normal pit stop at the stage breaks.
Restarts will be in the following order:
 Trucks that did not pit. Lead lap first, then lapped trucks.
 Trucks that pitted, in order of running order at the time the safety truck was called.
 Beneficiary
 Wave Around Trucks
 Trucks penalised for pit lane infractions, including exceeding the three-minute clock.
Penalties are as follows:
 A truck must restart on the tail end of the lead lap if they exceed the time limit on pit road or they pit other than the designated lap.
 A team must serve a two-lap penalty if they change tires any time except because of a damaged tire.

Schedule
The schedule for the 2020 season was released on April 3, 2019.

 Triple Truck Challenge races in bold.

Note: On the original schedule, the TTC races were supposed to be Richmond, Dover and Charlotte, but after COVID-19, that was no longer the case. On July 18, 2020, NASCAR announced that the challenge would still be done this season, and would now be at the Daytona Road Course, the rescheduled Dover race (moved from May to August), and Gateway.

Broadcasting
In the United States, all races are aired live on TV by NASCAR on Fox on FS1 (except the third Kansas race, which moved to Fox on a schedule change announced on September 28) and on Motor Racing Network on the radio.

Schedule changes

As with the Cup and Xfinity Series, NASCAR made numerous changes to the Truck Series schedule for the 2020 season. Of note is the return of the series to Richmond Raceway for the first time since 2005, which comes at the expense of the spring Martinsville date. Martinsville in exchange was given an Xfinity Series race for the first time after a hiatus for 24 of the last 25 years (the exception being a single event in 2006), which will be run in the fall on the same weekend as the Cup and Truck Series races there. Also, this will be the first season that the season finale will be at Phoenix Raceway while Homestead–Miami Speedway moves to March after Atlanta to become the fourth race of the season. Bristol is now the elimination race for the Round of 10 while the second Las Vegas race is the opener for the Round of 8 and Martinsville, now with only one date on the schedule, will end the Round of 8.

Schedule changes due to the COVID-19 pandemic
 On March 12, 2020, it was announced that the Vet Tix/Camping World 200 at Atlanta Motor Speedway and the Diabetes Can Break Your Heart 200 at Homestead–Miami Speedway would to take place without fans in attendance due to the COVID-19 pandemic. However, the following day in respect of the NBA  2019-2020 season suspension, NASCAR announced that those races (along with the Cup and Xfinity races on those same weekends, also at Atlanta and Homestead) would be outright postponed instead.
 On March 16, 2020, NASCAR announced all race events through May 3 would be postponed due to the COVID-19 pandemic.
 On May 8, 2020, NASCAR announced that Chicagoland Speedway would not host their Truck race, the Camping World 225, for this season only as part of the COVID-19 schedule changes. Later, NASCAR announced the creation of a 2nd race at Kansas Speedway to replace the cancelled event at Chicagoland.
 On May 14, 2020, NASCAR announced that Iowa Speedway would not host a Truck race, the M&M's 200, for this season only as part of the COVID-19 schedule changes.
 On July 8, 2020, NASCAR announced the series' schedule in the month of August. This included the addition of a race at the Daytona infield road course which replaced the cancelled Iowa race. In that announcement, it was also made official that the standalone race at Eldora would be cancelled and replaced and the same would go for the Canadian Tire Motorsport Park playoff race. Gateway remained on the schedule despite being a standalone race. Additionally, because of the loss of these two races, the Gateway race became part of the regular season instead of the first race of the playoffs, and Kansas and Texas will be in the playoffs. Later, on August 6, NASCAR announced that a race at Darlington would replace the cancelled Canadian Tire Motorsports Motorsport Park race and will be part of the regular season. It marks the series' first event at the historic track in more than nine years. A third race at Kansas would replace the cancelled Eldora event and will be part of the playoffs. In that announcement, it was also revealed that the series' playoff opener has been moved to Bristol Motor Speedway.

Results and standings

Race results

Drivers' championship

(key) Bold – Pole position awarded by time. Italics – Pole position set by final practice results or owner's points. * – Most laps led. 1 – Stage 1 winner. 2 – Stage 2 winner. 1-10 – Regular season top 10 finishers.
. – Eliminated after Round of 10
. – Eliminated after Round of 8

Owners' championship (Top 15)
(key) Bold – Pole position awarded by time. Italics – Pole position set by final practice results or rainout. * – Most laps led. 1 – Stage 1 winner. 2 – Stage 2 winner. 1-10 – Owners' regular season top 10 finishers. 
. – Eliminated after Round of 10
. – Eliminated after Round of 8

Manufacturers' Championship

See also
 2020 NASCAR Cup Series
 2020 NASCAR Xfinity Series
 2020 ARCA Menards Series
 2020 ARCA Menards Series East
 2020 ARCA Menards Series West
 2020 NASCAR Whelen Modified Tour
 2020 NASCAR Pinty's Series
 2020 NASCAR Whelen Euro Series
 2020 eNASCAR iRacing Pro Invitational Series
 2020 EuroNASCAR Esports Series

References

NASCAR Truck Series
NASCAR Truck Series seasons
Gander Outdoor Series
Gander Outdoor Series
NASCAR Gander Outdoor Series